In molecular biology FAD-oxidases are a family of FAD-dependent oxidoreductases. They are flavoproteins that contain a covalently bound FAD group which is attached to a histidine via an 8-alpha-(N3-histidyl)-riboflavin linkage. The region around the histidine that binds the FAD group is conserved in these enzymes.

References 

Protein families